The 1982 U.S. Women's Open was the 37th U.S. Women's Open, held July 22–25 at Del Paso Country Club in Sacramento, California.

Janet Alex shot a final round 68 (−4) for 283 (−5) to gain her only LPGA victory (and only major title), six strokes ahead of four  She began the final round in third, two strokes behind 54-hole leader Beth Daniel with two-time champion JoAnne Carner, the 36-hole leader, in second. Alex's 68 was the lowest score for all four rounds of the championship.

Attendance records were set for the U.S. Women's Open, with over 14,600 on Sunday and 44,600 for the week.

Past champions in the field

Source:

Final leaderboard
Sunday, July 25, 1982

Source:

References

External links
Golf Observer final leaderboard
U.S. Women's Open Golf Championship
Del Paso Country Club

U.S. Women's Open
Golf in California
Sports competitions in Sacramento, California
Women's sports in California
U.S. Women's Open
U.S. Women's Open
U.S. Women's Open
U.S. Women's Open